José Alves Ferreira (born 1891) was a Portuguese politician, and interim governor of Portuguese India (Índia Portuguesa), in 1948.

Governors-General of Portuguese India
1891 births
Year of death missing